Marli Siu (born 11 March 1993) is a Scottish actress. Her films include Anna and the Apocalypse (2017), Our Ladies (2019), and Run (2019), the latter of which won her a Scottish BAFTA. On television, Siu has appeared in the spy thriller Alex Rider (2020–2021) and the BBC drama Everything I Know About Love (2022).

Early life and education
Siu lived on Lamma Island in Hong Kong until she was four years old, before moving to and growing up in Forres in Moray, north-east Scotland. She attended Forres Academy. Her mother is Scottish from Edinburgh and her father was Chinese. She has four sisters.

Siu attended a youth theatre group in Elgin and joined the National Youth Theatre, and graduated with a Bachelor of Arts in Acting and English Literature from the Edinburgh Napier University.

Career
In 2015, Siu appeared in the short film Scoring, by Screen Academy Scotland, for which she was nominated for the ‘Under 25: Fresh Blood Award’ at the Underwire Film Festival. Her theatre credits include Dead Letter Office, Some Company, (co-writer); Much Ado About Nothing, Dundee Repertory Theatre (Ian Charleson Awards commendation) and The Ocean at the End of the Lane, The Royal National Theatre.

Siu moved to London in 2017, where she played Echo for 38 episodes of the CBBC web series Dixi. Her first major movie role came in 2017, when she played Lisa in John McPhail's zombie musical Anna and the Apocalypse, performing the song It's That Time of Year. The film premiered at the Fantastic Fest in Austin, Texas, and was released in the UK for Christmas 2018. Siu was named as one of the 15th Screen International's Stars of Tomorrow 2018 an annual talent showcase that spotlights up-and-coming British and Irish actors, writers, directors and producers from the UK and Ireland.

In 2019, Siu starred in the film Run, which premiered at the 2019 Tribeca Film Festival on 26 April in New York City. Later that year Siu starred in two films selected to be screened at the 2019 London Film Festival, Run and Our Ladies both due for an upcoming cinema release.

In 2020, Siu starred as Kyra, a student from Point Blanc, in the IMDb television teen spy series Alex Rider. Kyra teams up with Alex (Otto Farrant) and plays an important role in his attempted escape from incarceration.

Filmography

Film

Television

Web

Stage

Awards and nominations

References

External links

Marli Siu on Curtis Brown
instagram

Living people
21st-century Scottish actresses
Alumni of Edinburgh Napier University
Alumni of the Edinburgh College of Art
British actresses of Chinese descent
National Youth Theatre members
People from Forres
Scottish film actresses
Scottish television actresses
Scottish people of Hong Kong descent
1993 births